The UWA Law School is the law school of the University of Western Australia, located in Perth, Western Australia. 

The law school was established in 1927, and is the fifth-oldest law school in Australia. It is responsible for the publication of the University of Western Australia Law Review, the oldest university law review in Australia which began publication in 1948. In 2020, UWA Law School was ranked among the top 100 law schools in the world by QS World University Rankings and Times Higher Education, and thus is one of the highest ranked Australian law schools.

Notable alumni 

 Ben Wyatt (Treasurer of Western Australia, 2017–2021)
Michelle Gordon  (High Court Justice, 2015–present)
James Edelman (High Court Justice, 2017–present)
 Malcolm McCusker  (Governor of Western Australia, 2011–2014)
 Stephen Smith (federal minister, 2007–2013)
Christian Porter  (federal minister, 2015–2021)
 Robert French  (Chief Justice of Australia, 2008–2017)
 Sue Gordon  (magistrate and public servant)
 Bob Hawke  (Prime Minister of Australia, 1983–1991)

References

External links 

 

University of Western Australia
Law schools in Australia
Educational institutions established in 1927
1927 establishments in Australia